Fay Kelton (Born in Tasmania between 1940–41), is an Australian former actress  radio, stage and television, she relocated to Melbourne in her teens. She was a regular performer on the ABC radio serial Blue Hills (1949-1976), and also appeared in the shorter serials for commercial radio Danse Macabre and Forests of the Night.

Kelton also appeared in numerous television films and series, including a part based on the historical figure of Mary Bryant in the 1963 television series The Hungry Ones with Leonard Teale. She also starred in Nice Day at the Office, Cop Shop, Prisoner Cell Block H, A Country Practice and  Home and Away.

Biography

Kelton worked as a stage and radio actress prior to making her television acting debut in the live television play Who Killed Kovali? on the 13 July 1960. This was followed by a number of roles including the television film The End Begins (1961). Two years later, she was cast as Mary Bryant in the  television mini-series The Hungry Ones, with co-star Leonard Teale, and followed this with appearances in The Gioconda Smile (1963) and A Man for All Seasons (1964). She made a number of guest appearances on Homicide from 1964 to 1971. She also made one-time appearances on Dynasty and The Comedy Game, the latter performance leading to her role as Vicki Short in the comedy spinoff Nice Day at the Office in 1972.

Having moved from Melbourne to Sydney the previous year, she also performed on the ABC radio serial Blue Hills (as well as Danse Macabre and Forests of the Night) and in the Hugh Leonard farce "The Patrick Pearce Motel". She was working seven days a week and up to 16 hours a day. In 1974, she had a leading role in the televised play The Misanthrope.

Kelton guest starred in Ryan, Matlock Police, Division 4 and Power Without Glory. In 1981, she was cast as Alison Page on the soap opera Prisoner. Her character was introduced as a troubled housewife who is sent to prison for shoplifting. Despondent over the separation from her family and bullying from the other women, especially Doreen Burns (Colette Mann), she attempts suicide. Kelton later returned to stage acting and performed for the Northside Theatre Company in Sydney for much of the 1980s.

After a five-year absence from television, she appeared on A Country Practice in 1986 and the television miniseries Emma: Queen of the South Seas in 1988. In 1994, she had a recurring role as Anne Harris on Home and Away. She returned to acting once more to guest star on All Saints in 2001.

References

Further reading
Sumner, John. Recollections at Play: A Life in Australian Theatre. Melbourne: Melbourne University Press, 1993.

External links

Living people
Australian stage actresses
Australian television actresses
Australian radio actresses
1940 births